John Tyler, DD (1640–1724) was a Dean of Hereford and a Bishop of Llandaff.

Tyler was educated at Magdalen College, Oxford. He held incumbencies at Shobdon, Litton Cheney and Brinsop. He was a Chaplain to William III and Mary II. He died on 8 July 1724.

Notes

Alumni of Magdalen College, Oxford
Deans of Hereford
Bishops of Llandaff
1640 births
1724 deaths
18th-century Welsh Anglican bishops